Mankada Ravi Varma (4 June 1926 – 22 November 2010) was an Indian cinematographer and director who worked in Malayalam cinema. He is exclusively known for his association with renowned film-maker Adoor Gopalakrishnan. He has associated with other major directors such as G. Aravindan and P. N. Menon. He has also directed two films. He has won two National Film Awards and seven Kerala State Film Awards in various categories. In 2006, he was honoured with the J. C. Daniel Award, Kerala government's highest honour for contributions to Malayalam cinema.

Early life 
Ravi Varma was born at Mankada in Malappuram district to K.K. Thampuratti and A.M. Parameswaran Bhattathiripad on 4 June 1926. Varma was keenly interested in photography since a child. He had his graduation from Victoria College, Palakkad and later learned motion picture photography at the Institute of Film Technology (FTIT) in Chennai.

Career
After his studies from FTIT, he worked as a cinematographer for several documentaries and short films. His debut film was Aval (1966) was directed by Aziz, another student from the institute. His first notable work was Olavum Theeravum (1970), directed by P. N. Menon and scripted by M. T. Vasudevan Nair. It was a landmark film in Malayalam as it was the first Malayalam film to be shot entirely outdoors. Varma remembered those days, "We exploited the available light. The framing and composition of the film were totally different from other feature films. I tried to accommodate all the tones that were available in black-and-white, and shot the film. As I had shot documentaries in very adverse conditions, I decided to make use of all those experiences in a feature film. Usually in poor light, a cinematographer stops shooting. What I did was use it to my advantage."
His other notable works as a cinematographer include Dikkatra Parvathi (1973) by Singeetam Srinivasa Rao, Uttarayanam (1974) by G. Aravindan, and almost all the works with Adoor Gopalakrishnan.

Association with Adoor
Ravi Varma had written an article on films in a magazine called Sameeksha which Gopalakrishnan, a student at the FTII happened to read. He wrote to Ravi Varma asking him to write another piece for a magazine that he was editing from the institute. That was how the association and friendship between renowned director Adoor Gopalakrishnan and Ravi Varma started. Whenever Adoor came down to Kerala, he would make a stop over in Madras and meet him. The friendship that started in the 60s became a professional association in the early 70s when Adoor Gopalakrishnan made Swayamvaram (1971).

When Adoor Gopalakrishnan watched Olavum Theeravum, he decided that when he made a film, it was Mankada Ravi Varma who would shoot it. When he was ready to make Swayamvaram, he asked Ravi Varma whether he would do the cinematography. But he had no intention to shoot another feature film after Olavum Theeravum, as it had affected his regular work. But he couldn't say 'no' to Adoor. Swayamvaram was their first effort, one of the first serious films made in Kerala, a film that started a revolution and changed the way films were made in Kerala. The film won not only several National Awards but international acclaim too. Mankada also won the National Award for cinematography. Elippathayam (1981) was one of the most acclaimed films came out of their association. In this magnum opus film, Varma even had to draw electric power from the mains of the house they were shooting in, as they had no money to hire a generator.
Other major works by Varma with Adoor include Kodiyettam (1977), Mukhamukham (1984), Mathilukal (1990), Vidheyan (1993) and Nizhalkuthu (2002). He has associated with Adoor in all his films, before he fell ill in 2002. Nizhalkuthu was their last film. Varma could not complete this work as he fell ill soon after the filming had started. Later, this film was completed by Sunny Joseph. Adoor rates this film as the best work by Varma. In an interview he said: "I would rate Nizhalkuthu, as Raviettan's best ever work, 30 years after we started our journey together with Swayamvaram."

Career as a director
In 1984, he directed his first film, Nokkukuthi, which won him another National Award and a State award. It was based on a poem by noted Malayalam poet, M Govindan. "I made it for my own satisfaction. People who are like me will also get satisfaction of watching my film", says Varma. He also directed Kunjikoonan in 1989.

He also wrote a book Chitram Chala Chitram about cinematography which won him the State award for the best book on cinema.

Death
Ravi Varma died on 22 November 2010 evening in Chennai. He was suffering from Alzheimer's disease for many years.

Adoor Gopalakrishnan in an obituary to Mankada Ravi Varma has said: "I never asked him why he only worked only with me, as he used to say he wanted to do only good films. Raviettan is the only person to whom I used to courier my script before they were made. His response and clarity on my script encouraged me a lot."

Filmography

As cinematographer
 Aval (1967)
 Olavum Theeravum (1970)
 Swayamvaram (1971)
 Dikkatra Parvathi (1974)
 Uttarayanam (1974)
 Kodiyettam (1977)
 Yakshagana (1979)
 Chola Heritage (1980)
 Krishnanattam (1982)
 Kalamandalam Gopi (1995)
 Elippathayam (1981)
 Mukhamukham (1984)
 Anantaram (1987)
 Mathilukal (1990)
 Vidheyan (1993)
 Kathapurushan (1996)
 Koodiyaattam (2001)
 Nizhalkkuthu (2002)

As director
 Nokkukuthi (1984)
 Kunjikoonan (1989)

Awards

Kerala State Awards 

 1970: Kerala State Film Award for Best Photography – Olavum Theeravum
 1972: Kerala State Film Award for Best Photography – Swayamvaram
 1974: Kerala State Film Award for Best Photography – Uttarayanam
 1981: Kerala State Film Award for Best Photography – Elippathayam
 1983: Kerala State Film Award for Best Photography – Nokkukuthi
 1984: Kerala State Film Award for Best Photography – Mukhamukham
 1986: Kerala State Film Award for Best Book on Cinema – Chitram Chala Chitram
 2002: Kerala State Film Award for Best Photography – Nizhalkuthu
 2005: J. C. Daniel Award (Honorary)

National Awards 

 1972: National Film Award for Best Cinematography – Swayamvaram
 1983: National Film Award – Special Jury Award / Special Mention – Nokkukuthi
 1999: National Film Award for Best Non-Feature Film Cinematography – Kalamandalam Gopi

References 

1926 births
2010 deaths
J. C. Daniel Award winners
Best Cinematography National Film Award winners
Special Jury Award (feature film) National Film Award winners
Kerala State Film Award winners
Malayalam film cinematographers
Government Victoria College, Palakkad alumni
20th-century Indian film directors
Malayalam film directors
M.G.R. Government Film and Television Training Institute alumni
20th-century Indian photographers
21st-century Indian photographers
Cinematographers from Kerala
People from Malappuram district